Tomasz Wasilewski (born 26 September 1980) is a Polish film director and screenwriter. His 2016 film United States of Love was shown at the 66th Berlin International Film Festival where he won the Silver Bear for Best Script.

Filmography
 United States of Love (2016)
 Floating Skyscrapers (2013)
 W sypialni (2012)
 Show Jednego Czlowieka (2008) documentary short

References

External links

1980 births
Living people
People from Toruń
Polish film directors
Polish screenwriters
Silver Bear for Best Screenplay winners